Rosy Lovers is a 2014 South Korean television series starring Lee Jang-woo and Han Sun-hwa. It aired on MBC from October 18, 2014 to April 12, 2015 on Saturdays and Sundays at 20:40 for 52 episodes.

Plot
Baek Jang-mi is a sophomore majoring in design, a rich girl who grew up without experiencing any hardship in life. Jang-mi's parents want to marry her off to an eligible man they chose for her, but she rebels and begins dating engineering student Park Cha-dol. Lively and outgoing Cha-dol was raised by a single mother, and he's eager to graduate and start earning money to take care of his mom. But when Jang-mi gets pregnant, she and Cha-dol are forced to change their plans, and must begin raising a child while both are still in college. In the process, they slowly gain maturity and learn the true meaning of love.

Cast
Lee Jang-woo as Park Cha-dol 
Han Sun-hwa as Baek Jang-mi 
Lee Mi-sook as Jung Shi-nae
Chang Mi-hee as Go Yeon-hwa
Park Sang-won as Lee Young-gook
Jeong Bo-seok as Baek Man-jong
Im Ye-jin as So Geum-ja
Kim Min-seo as Baek Soo-ryun
Han Ji-sang as Park Kang-tae
Yoon A-jung as Park Se-ra
Choi Phillip as Go Jae-dong
Kim Young-ok as Jo Bang-shil
Ban Hyo-jung as Ma Pil-soon
Lee Go-eun as Park Cho-rong
Gil Eun-hye as Seo Joo-young

Awards and nominations

International broadcast
 In Singapore, the drama began airing on Mediacorp Channel U from March 8, 2016 with English and Chinese subtitles with options of Chinese dubbed audio or the original Korean audio.
 In Thailand,  the drama began airing on True4U from January 13, 2016 on Mondays and Tuesdays at 13:00 to 14:00

References

External links
Rosy Lovers official MBC website 
Rosy Lovers at MBC Global Media

MBC TV television dramas
2014 South Korean television series debuts
Korean-language television shows
2015 South Korean television series endings
South Korean romance television series
South Korean comedy television series